Pinyon–juniper woodland, also spelled piñon–juniper woodland, is a vegetation type (biome) of Western United States higher elevation deserts, characterized by being an open forest dominated by low, bushy, evergreen junipers (Juniperus osteosperma, Juniperus californica, Juniperus grandis), pinyon pines (Pinus monophylla, Pinus edulis), and their associates which vary from region to region. The woodland's density and crown height varies dramatically depending on the site's soil and climate, the age of the stand, and the particular species present, with mature trees ranging in height from as low as 2 meters up to 15 meters. At lower elevations, junipers often predominate and trees are spaced widely, bordering on and mingling with grassland or shrubland. As elevation increases, pinyon pines become common and trees grow closer, forming denser canopies. Historically, pinyon-juniper woodland has provided a vital source of fuel and food (particularly piñon nuts) for peoples of the American Southwest.

Biome classification 
Pinyon–juniper plant community has been associated with desert climates, informally. Biome classification recognizes that pinyons require twelve inches of precipitation annually. Small junipers may grow in climates down to nine inches precipitation annually. Because deserts are recognized to have less than ten inches of precipitation, and are generally barren of vegetation, a pinyon tree cannot survive in the desert.  Where climate exceeds ten inches annual precipitation the classification "steppes" is used. Pinyons and junipers will grow preferentially in steppes of shallow soils, whereas grassland may dominate deeper soils.

Range

The pinyon–juniper woodland range spans from New Mexico, to the eastern Sierra Nevada, the Colorado Plateau, the Great Basin, and higher elevations of Mountain ranges of the Mojave Desert. The woodland's range includes the Mogollon Rim in the south, to its northern extent in the Snake River Plain.

Arizona and New Mexico

The pinyon–juniper woodland is one of the most prevalent types of coniferous woodland in northern Arizona and New Mexico.
In Arizona the great basin woodland species are Juniperus arizonica, Juniperus californica in western Arizona, Juniperus deppeana, Juniperus monosperma, Juniperus osteosperma, Juniperus scopulorum at higher elevations, Pinus monophylla var. fallax below the Colorado plateau, and Pinus edulis on the Colorado plateau. In Arizona the great basin woodland includes many species of oaks: Quercus turbinella, Quercus gambelii at higher elevations, Quercus grisea, Quercus arizonica, and Quercus emoryi.  In Southern Arizona, Pinus discolor, Juniperus deppeana, and Pinus leiophylla make up the conifer woodland with many oak species.

Utah and Canyonlands region
The pinyon–juniper plant community covers a large portion of Utah and the Canyonlands region. singleleaf ash (Fraxinus anomala), and Utah serviceberry (Amelanchier utahensis) are codominants of pinyon pine and Utah juniper. In this region, the community occurs on rocky soils or jointed bedrock.

Mojave Desert
In the steppes adjoining the Mojave Desert, this vegetation type can be found in areas receiving 12–20 inches of annual precipitation, and between 4,500 and 8,000 feet. Associates include bitterbrush (Purshia glandulosa), Apache plume(Fallugia paradoxa), desert sagebrush (Artemisia tridentata), green ephedra (Ephedra viridis), mountain mahoganies (Cercocarpus spp.), and buckwheats (Eriogonum spp.). In the Mojave, pinyon–juniper woodlands are generally above the Joshua Tree woodlands vegetation type, and requires more annual precipitation.

Sierra Nevada
In the eastern Sierra Nevada, the elevation range is 4,000-5,500 feet in the north, and 5,000 to 8,000 feet in the southern reaches of the range. Pinyon–juniper woodland requires 12–20 inches of annual precipitation, so is generally located above the sagebrush scrub vegetation type, which can survive on an average of 7 inches per year. It is located below the alpine zone. There is often an understory dominated by sagebrush (Artemisia tridentata) and its associates. Co-dominants include Jeffrey Pine (Pinus jeffreyi) and an understory of sagebrush scrub or rabbitbrush scrub (Ericameria spp.).

Other information

Pinyon pines have a very slow growth pattern and can take almost a century to reach 12 meters in height, only begin to grow cones after 35 years, and perform seed masting every 5 to 7 years throughout their lifetime. This particular woodland habitat is not adapted to fire, where fuel loads are not large or significant enough to maintain a devastating fire, although many of the accessory plants are particularly vulnerable to wildfires which can be critical to the environment because these tree species strictly rely upon various nurse plants for assistance in new growth. Though prescribed fire has been applied to these regions in order to manage the land, clear the landscape for new recruitment, or used to feed livestock animals, a negative consequence of prescribed burns usually deplete seed banks within the community as well as open the space to annual grasses which are more often invasive and ideal fuel stock. Cheatgrass is one of those invasive species that continues to promote type conversion via more frequent wildfire intervals.
Variations in elevation create an ecotone between the juniper and pinyon species, where they can commonly overlap at around an elevation of 5,000 feet. However, there are some problems with the juniper species, specifically the Western juniper which can be invasive to the understory, herbaceous layer, and wildlife environments. Lack of an herbaceous layer leads to increased soil erosion and removal of groundwater resources due to the over exploitative nature that junipers have in that ecosystem.

Junipers, dominant species:
Juniperus osteosperma
Juniperus monosperma
Juniperus scopulorum
Juniperus californica
Pinyon pine, dominant species:
Pinus edulis (Colorado pinyon or two-needle pinyon)
Pinus monophylla (single-leaf pinyon)

See also
:Category:Flora of the Southwestern United States
:Category:Flora of the Great Basin
:Category:Flora of the California desert regions

References

Sources

Deserts and xeric shrublands in the United States
Montane forests

Plant communities of the Western United States
Plant communities of California

 Pinyon-juniper woodland

Forests of Nevada
Natural history of the Mojave Desert

Plants by habitat